The Westchester County Bee-Line System, branded on the buses in lowercase as the bee-line system, is a bus system serving Westchester County, New York. The system is owned by the county's Department of Public Works and Transportation.

History
The system was founded on May 1, 1978, by the then Westchester County Department of Transportation to consolidate the bus system with thirteen private bus companies and has been given control over the buses, fare structure, routes, and services. By the 1980s, the bus system had an identity problem in who was providing the service. On May 19, 1987, WCDOT officially named the bus service "The Bee-Line System" with a 'bee-in-flight' mascot drawn by cartoonist Jack Davis.

The Westchester County Department of Public Works and Transportation currently contracts out to two private bus companies to provide service in Westchester County and the surrounding counties: Yonkers-based Liberty Lines Transit, Inc., the main company that either bought out or obtained franchises from the other twelve bus companies over the years, operates buses on all but three bus routes; and Cortlandt Manor-based P.T.L.A. Enterprise, Inc., a small company that operates buses on routes 16, 18, and 31.

Scope of service

Most Bee-Line routes operate seven days a week. There is no service county-wide on two days of the calendar year, Thanksgiving (the fourth Thursday in November), and Christmas (December 25).

Within Westchester

The system's 64 routes are mostly concentrated in the more urban southern portion of the county, with the cities of Mount Vernon, New Rochelle, and Yonkers receiving a high frequency of service. White Plains, the county seat and most centrally located city, is a major transportation hub with many routes converging on the city's TransCenter.

Service in the northern portion of Westchester is sparse and is concentrated near slightly populated areas such as Mount Kisco, Ossining, or Peekskill. Areas such as Lewisboro, North Salem, and Pound Ridge receive paratransit service only. During the school year, special bus routes also operate. All but the county's smallest, most rural communities have at least rush hour service.

Outside Westchester
Because Westchester County borders on the New York City borough of the Bronx, many of the Bee-Line's routes operate into the Bronx, offering Westchester residents connections to MTA New York City Transit buses and subways; at least one Bee-Line route connects to every subway route serving the Bronx. The Bee-Line System also operates an express route, the BxM4C from White Plains, Greenburgh, Hartsdale, Scarsdale, and Yonkers along Central Park Avenue to Fifth Avenue in Manhattan (return trips operate on Madison Avenue within Manhattan).

Bee-Line operates mostly closed-door service in the Bronx (local service is not provided solely for travel within the Bronx; appropriate MTA Regional Bus Operations service must be used instead). The only exceptions are:
 Route 8, which terminates at the College of Mount Saint Vincent on the Bronx/Yonkers border;
 Routes 40, 41, 42 and 43, which run along White Plains Road north of the Wakefield – 241st Street subway terminal;
 Route 45, which serves the Pelham Bay Park subway terminal, the Pelham Bay and Split Rock Golf Course, and the Bartow-Pell Mansion;
 Route 54, which runs on Mundy Lane along the Bronx/Mount Vernon border, since no other bus routes travel entirely through these areas;
 and Routes 60 and 61, which run along US Route 1 (East Fordham and Boston roads in the Bronx).

In addition, Route 12 (Armonk-Purchase-White Plains) briefly enters Greenwich, Connecticut along King Street, in which it makes stops in Greenwich and Rye Brook, New York along the New York/Connecticut border; Route 77 enters Putnam County to serve the US Route 6 corridor between Mahopac and Carmel; and Route 16 briefly enters Putnam County to serve the Mahopac Village Centre.

Fares

All fares require exact change or MetroCard. All transfers are free with payment of fare. Dollar bills are not accepted on any Bee-Line System buses.

Bee-Line Bus started accepting MetroCard on April 1, 2007. The fare for the BxM4C went down from $7 to $5. The regular fare was $2 for MetroCard, and $1.75 if paid in cash. Dollar bills, passports, and ticket books were no longer accepted for fare payment after this date. MetroCard Vans made stops on heavily used routes to help people get ready for the MetroCard. On July 23, 2019, it was announced that the Bee-Line bus fare system on all buses would be upgraded to the OMNY fare system in 2021–2022, replacing the MetroCard. The Westchester County Department of Transportation states that "OMNY is targeted for introduction on the Bee-Line Bus System beginning in 2022 at the earliest. MetroCard will continue to be accepted by New York City Transit subways and buses and Bee-Line service until 2023, enabling Bee-Line passengers to have the option of using MetroCard or OMNY during the transition phase. By the end of 2023, MetroCard will be discontinued and all Bee-Line passengers will then use OMNY. The Reduced-Fare MetroCard Program will also be converted over to OMNY."

For certain periods during the summer and winter of 2022, the busses were fare-free.

Fleet

Active fleet
This roster only lists buses and shuttle vans used in fixed route service. Paratransit vehicles are not listed. All buses are wheelchair accessible.

Past fleet

Historical Honors on Fleet
In October 2004, then-Westchester County Executive Andrew J. Spano launched a month-long celebration of local history by unveiling the top 15 winning names, which were applied on all of the 2002 Orion 05.505 buses.  From 2005 to January 2012, these buses each bore the name of a person, place, or thing that played a role in the development of Westchester County.

Future fleet
In February 2020, it was announced that Westchester County's Bee-Line Bus fleet would be expanding with 78 hybrid-electric 60-foot buses (all delivered by summer 2020), 106 hybrid-electric 40-foot buses and two 40-foot battery-electric buses - all built by New Flyer Industries - under a plan to have the entire transit bus fleet running on either fully electric or diesel-electric hybrid technology by 2025. As of July 2020, 40 40-foot diesel-electric buses and two 40-foot battery-electric are planned to be delivered between 2021 and 2025. Four 35-foot battery-electric buses are also planned to be delivered, totaling 6 battery-electric buses by 2025.

References

External links

 Bee-Line Bus System
 Bee-Line Roster as of 2002

Bus transportation in New York (state)
Transportation in Yonkers, New York
Transportation in Westchester County, New York
1978 introductions
Surface transportation in Greater New York
Paratransit services in the United States